A list of rock formations worldwide that resemble human beings.

Canada 

 Sleeping Giant, Thunder Bay, Ontario

United Kingdom

 The Old Man of Hoy in Orkney is a rock pillar that from certain angles is said to resemble a standing man.
 Queen Victoria's Rock on the Isle of Barra is a rock formation near Northbay on the north side of the A888, looking toward the west, which resembles the profile of the elderly Queen Victoria.
 The Sleeping Warrior is the profile of the peaks of the island of Arran.

United States
 Old Man of the Mountain, Lincoln, New Hampshire.
 The Indian Head, New Hampshire.
 Profile Rock, Massachusetts.

See also
Breast-shaped hill

References

Rock formations